The 12th Ohio Cavalry Regiment was a cavalry regiment that served in the Union Army during the American Civil War.

Service
The 12th Ohio Cavalry Regiment was organized at Camp Taylor in Cleveland, Ohio, and mustered in November 24, 1863, for a three years under the command of Colonel Robert Wilson Ratliff.

The regiment was attached to 2nd Brigade, 5th Division, XXIII Corps, District of Kentucky, Department of the Ohio, to July 1864. 4th Brigade, 1st Division, District of Kentucky, Department of the Ohio, to February 1865. 1st Brigade, Cavalry Division, District of East Tennessee, Department of the Cumberland, to July 1865. Cavalry Brigade, District East Tennessee, to November 1865.

The 12th Ohio Cavalry mustered out of service November 14, 1865, at Nashville, Tennessee.

Detailed service
Duty at Camp Chase, Ohio, until February 1864, Johnson's Island (Company C as Guards) and at Camp Dennison until March. Ordered to Nashville, Tenn., March 31, 1862. Operations against Morgan's invasion of Kentucky May 31-June 20, 1864. Action at Mt. Sterling, Ky., June 9. Cynthiana June 12. Skirmish at Lebanon, Ky., July 30 (1 company). Burbridge's Expedition into southwestern Virginia September 20-October 17. McCormack's Farm September 23. Laurel Mountain September 29. Action at Saltville, Va., October 2. Stoneman's Raid from Bean's Station, Tenn., into southwestern Virginia, December 10–29. Bristol December 14. Marion December 17–18. Saltville December 20–21. Stoneman's Raid into southwestern Virginia and western North Carolina March 21-April 25, 1865. Wilkesborough March 29. Wilkinsville N.C., April 8. Danbury April 9. Statesville and Salem April 11. Salisbury April 12. Dallas and Catawba River April 17. Swannanoah Gap April 20. Howard's Gap, Blue Ridge Mountains, April 22. Asheville April 25. Duty in middle Tennessee, eastern Tennessee, and North Carolina, until November 1865.

Casualties
The regiment lost a total of 164 men during service; 50 enlisted men killed or mortally wounded, 112 enlisted men died of disease.

Commanders
 Colonel Robert Wilson Ratliff

Notable members
 Corporal Merriman Colbert Harris, Company H - Missionary Bishop of the Methodist Episcopal Church, elected in 1904.
 Bugler William Allen Magee, Company M - Third-last verified surviving Union veteran of the Civil War. He died January 23, 1953, in Long Beach, California, at age 106. He is listed as enlisting as a bugler on October 20, 1863, at age 18 (a 2-year age exaggeration).

See also

 List of Ohio Civil War units
 Ohio in the Civil War

References
 Bushong, William. The Last Great Stoneman Raid (S.l.:  s.n.), 1910.  [author served in Company C]
 Dyer, Frederick H.  A Compendium of the War of the Rebellion (Des Moines, IA:  Dyer Pub. Co.), 1908.
 Mason, Frank Holcomb. The Twelfth Ohio Cavalry:  A Record of Its Organization, and Services in the War of the Rebellion, Together With a Complete Roster of the Regiment (Cleveland, OH:  Nevins' Steam Printing House), 1871.
 Ohio Roster Commission. Official Roster of the Soldiers of the State of Ohio in the War on the Rebellion, 1861–1865, Compiled Under the Direction of the Roster Commission (Akron, OH: Werner Co.), 1886–1895.
 Reid, Whitelaw. Ohio in the War: Her Statesmen, Her Generals, and Soldiers (Cincinnati, OH: Moore, Wilstach, & Baldwin), 1868. 
 Sheldon, R. H. History of the Twelfth Ohio Cavalry (Philadelphia, PA:  Grand Army Scout and Soldiers' Mail), 1885.
Attribution

External links
 Ohio in the Civil War: 12th Ohio Cavalry by Larry Stevens
 Booklet from the third annual reunion of the 12th Ohio Cavalry, 1888
 Regimental flag of the 12th Ohio Cavalry
 Guidon of the 12th Ohio Cavalry
 Another guidon of the 12th Ohio Cavalry

Military units and formations established in 1863
Military units and formations disestablished in 1865
Units and formations of the Union Army from Ohio
1863 establishments in Ohio